Bocula bifaria is a moth of the family Erebidae first described by Francis Walker in 1863. It is found in the Philippines, Peninsular Malaysia, Sumatra and Borneo.

References

Rivulinae
Moths described in 1863